Over its long history, the Holy Roman Empire used many different heraldic forms, representing its numerous internal divisions.

Imperial coat of arms

Coats of arms of Holy Roman Emperors 

The Reichsadler ("Imperial Eagle") was the heraldic eagle,  derived from the Roman eagle standard, used by the Holy Roman Emperors and in modern coats of arms of Germany, including those of the Second German Empire (1871–1918), the Weimar Republic (1919–1933) and the "Third Reich" (Nazi Germany, 1933–1945). The same design has remained in use by the Federal Republic of Germany since 1945, but under a different name, now called Bundesadler ("Union Eagle" or "Federal Eagle", from German "Bund", genitive form "Bundes" meaning 'Union' or 'Federation', and "Adler" meaning 'Eagle').

Quaternion Eagle 

One rendition of the coat of the empire was the "Quaternion Eagle" (so named after the imperial quaternions) printed by David de Negker of Augsburg, after a 1510 woodcut by Hans Burgkmair. It showed a selection of 56 shields of various Imperial States in groups of four on the feathers of a double-headed eagle supporting, in place of a shield, Christ on the Cross. The top, larger shields, are those of the seven Prince Electors, the ecclesiastical: Trier, Cologne and Mainz as well as of the titular "Prefect of Rome" on the right wing; the secular: Bohemia, Electorate of the Palatinate, Saxony and Brandenburg on the left. The depiction also appeared on the Imperial Eagle beaker.

Holy Roman Emperors

Direct attestations of imperial coats of arms become available in the later 13th century. 
Past emperors are given attributed arms in 13th-century sources. Thus, Otto IV is given the first known depiction of a double-headed Reichsadler in the Chronica Majora (ca. 1250). Henry VI is given a (single-headed) Reichsadler in the Codex Manesse (c. 1320).

Frederick II of Hohenstaufen (Emperor 1220–1250) did not use coats of arms in any of his seals. He did use the imperial eagle on some of his coins, but not displayed as a heraldic charge in a heraldic shield. Frederick's son and co-ruler Henry did have an equestrian seal with the Hohenstaufen coat of arms of three leopards, and this coat of arms is later attributed to Frederick II as well.

From the reign of Albert II (reigned 1438–39, was never crowned emperor), each Emperor bore the old Imperial arms (Or, an eagle displayed sable beaked and membered gules) with an inescutcheon of pretence of his personal family arms. This appears therefore as a black eagle with an escutcheon on his breast. Before 1438 the Emperors used separate personal and an imperial coat of arms.  The arms of the High Offices of the Empire were borne as an augmentation to the office-holder's personal arms.

High offices (Reichserzämter)

Prince-electors 

The seven Electors named in the Golden Bull of 1356 were: the Prince-Bishops of Cologne, Mainz and Trier, the King of Bohemia, the Count Palatine of the Rhine, the Duke of Saxony and the Margrave of Brandenburg.

The Count Palatine was replaced by the Duke of Bavaria in 1623, as the Elector Palatine, Frederick V, came under the imperial ban after participating in the Bohemian Revolt. The  Count Palatine was granted a new electorate in 1648. Saxony was held by a Protestant elector from 1525 (John), the Palatinate  from 1541 (Otto Henry). In 1685, a Catholic branch of the Wittelsbach family inherited the Palatinate and a new Protestant electorate was created in 1692 for the Duke of Brunswick-Lüneburg, who became known as the Elector of Hanover (officially confirmed by the Imperial Diet in 1708). The Elector of Saxony (Augustus II) converted to Catholicism in 1697 so that he could become King of Poland, but no additional Protestant electors were created, and the Electorate itself remained officially Protestant.

Spiritual Electors

Secular Electors

Other states 

Entries are listed by Imperial Circle (introduced 1500, 1512) even for territories that ceased to exist prior to 1500.

Austrian Circle

Bavarian Circle

Burgundian Circle

Franconian Circle

Lower Rhenish-Westphalian Circle

Upper Rhenish Circle

Electoral Rhenish Circle

Lower Saxon Circle

Upper Saxon Circle

Swabian Circle

Lands of the Bohemian Crown

Other

See also
Flags of the Holy Roman Empire
Coat of arms of Germany

References

Heraldry of the Holy Roman Empire
Holy Roman Empire
Holy Roman Empire
Holy Roman Empire
Christian symbols